There are four seas in world that named in English after common color names: the Red Sea, White Sea, Black Sea and Yellow Sea. Their names are given with color of the water. Sometimes a system of color symbolism was used as following method like green or light blue for east, black or dark for north, white for west and red for south.  This method is called cardinal directions. There are other theories but these two method of colors are also used.

Red Sea 

The Red Sea is one of the four seas named in English after common color terms.. The Red Sea is lying between Asia and Africa. It is surrounded by six countries: Yemen and  Saudi Arabia in Eastern shore and Sudan, Djibouti, Egypt  and Eritrea in Western shore. The name of Red Sea is given on same symbolism scheme as the Black Sea. as well Persian Gulf. Since it is situated in southern part of Turkey, hence name of this sea is “Red Sea”. Sometimes the bacteria of this sea creates the color of water is red; that tint to Red Sea.

White Sea 

The White Sea is one of the four seas named in English after common color terms. The White Sea is located on the northwest coast of Russia in the Arctic Ocean. The White Sea is covered in ice for most of the year giving its name of the White Sea.

It is noted that the Mediterranean Sea is situated in western part of Turkey. In Turkish culture, name of Mediterranean Sea was “White Sea” according to symbolism scheme or cardinal direction.

Black Sea 

The Black Sea is one of the four seas named in English after common color terms. The Black Sea is lying between Asia and Europe. It is surrounded by six countries; Romania and Bulgaria  in the west, Georgia and Russia in the east, Ukraine in the north and Turkey in the south. Name of the “Black Sea” due to dark the color of water. Since it is situated in northern part of Turkey, hence name of this sea is “Black Sea” according to symbolism scheme or cardinal directions. It was called either Bahr-E Siyah or Karadeniz during the Ottoman Empire, the meaning of the both words are “Black Sea” in Turkish.

Yellow Sea 

The Yellow Sea is one of the four seas named in English after common colors. The Yellow Sea lies between East Asia and Korea or between the Korean Peninsula and mainland China. Three countries border it: China, North Korea and South Korea. The yellowish water of Yellow River flows into this sea. The water contains sand and silt in great quantities, which contribute to the yellowish color of sea.

Chinese culture used a fifth cardinal direction besides East, South, West and North. The fifth one is the Middle or Center. The Middle was symbolized by the color yellow. The Huang He River is renowned for its central importance to Chinese life. The Yellow Sea could be so named for a similar relationship.

See also 

 Caucasian Riviera
 Sea of Azov
 Red Sea Dam
 Baltic Sea
 Western Pacific Ocean
 Yellow River

External links 
 Something geography

References 

Black Sea
Seas of the Mediterranean Sea
Seas of Turkey
Seas of the Atlantic Ocean
Red Sea
Suez Canal
Seas of Yemen
Geography of Western Asia
Yellow Sea
Geography of East Asia
Seas of China
Seas of South Korea
Seas of North Korea
White Sea
Seas of Russia
Seas of the Arctic Ocean
European seas